The Virginia Constitutional Convention of 1829–1830 was a constitutional convention for the state of Virginia, held in Richmond from October 5, 1829 to January 15, 1830.

Background and composition 

Almost immediately, the Constitution of 1776 was recognized as flawed both for its restriction of the suffrage by property requirements, and for its malapportionment favoring the smaller eastern counties. Between 1801 and 1813, petitioners called on the Assembly to initiate a constitutional convention ten times.  The House of Delegates passed a bill twice, but the conservative eastern planter majority in the Virginia Senate killed both measures. Continuing growth in the western parts of the state led to another fifteen years of agitation. Several counties in the Eastern Shore, northern Piedmont and western counties began opening polls for direct expression from the voters for a constitutional convention; eventually there were twenty-eight such counties calling for reform.

Malapportionment in the Assembly was seen as "an usurpation of the minority over the majority" by the slave owning eastern aristocracy. Partisans argued for apportionment by white population, versus "federal numbers" combining white population with three-fifths slaves, versus the existing system counting whites and slaves equally to favor the slave-holding eastern counties. After several General Assembly sessions with close votes for calling a convention, in 1828 the Assembly allowed for a statewide ballot for "Convention", "Neutral" or "No Convention". It passed by 56.8 percent, with most convention support coming from west of the Blue Ridge Mountains northwest to the Ohio River. But the easterners in the State Senate had stacked the deck in their favor, by apportioning the delegates by four per Senate district, producing a group of men which was more wealthy and more conservative than the House of Delegates.

The last "gathering of giants" from the Revolutionary generation included former presidents James Madison and James Monroe, and sitting Chief Justice John Marshall. But three generations were represented among those who would serve in public office including three presidents, seven U.S. Senators, fifteen U.S. Representatives and four governors. The other delegates to the Convention were sitting judges or members of the Virginia General Assembly.

Meeting and debate 
The Convention met from October 5, 1829 – January 15, 1830, and elected former president James Monroe of Loudoun its presiding officer. On December 8, Monroe withdrew due to failing health, and the Convention elected Philip P. Barbour as its new presiding officer. Barbour was a former Speaker of the U.S. House of Representatives, a sitting federal district judge, and a future Justice on the Supreme Court. Conservatives among the Old Republicans such as John Randolph of Roanoke feared any change from the Founders' 1776 Constitution would lead to an ideological anarchy of "wild abstractions" imposed by egalitarian "French Jacobins" through "this maggot of innovation". In answer, John Marshall advanced his view with a petition from the freeholders of Richmond which observed that, "Virtue, intelligence, are not among the products of the soil. Attachment to [slave] property, often a sordid sentiment, is not to be confounded with the sacred flame of patriots." Any white male who had served in the War of 1812 or who would serve in the militia in there future defense of the country deserved the right to vote.

Abel P. Upshur, a judge on the Virginia General Court, spoke for conservatives when he asserted that there "is a majority of interest as well as a majority in number". Because both persons and property were the "elements of society", majority rule by the people alone was not an equitable solution. "Those who have the greatest [property] stake in the Government…[must] have the greatest share of power in the administration of it." Lawyer John R. Cooke, a veteran of the War of 1812 countered that delegates must base the Constitution and legislative representation on the wishes of citizens, "the white population…[looking] to the people" for its authority, not only the wealthy, not to sectional slave-holding interests, and "not to the supposed rights of the [unequally populated] counties."

Reformers' efforts to adopt direct popular election of the Governor were defeated in favor of continuing election by the General Assembly. Thomas Jefferson Randolph, Thomas Jefferson's grandson, proposed gradual emancipation, a suggestion which never made it out of committee onto the Convention floor. The reformers lost on almost every issue. Nevertheless, even with the exaggerated Virginia Senate representation apportioning the delegates in favor of the status quo, the three most important roll calls were close.  The "white" population basis of apportioning the General Assembly failed by two votes. The extension of the vote to all free white males failed by two votes. When the popular election of governor passed on its first vote, it failed on reconsideration. The divisions which would lead to West Virginia's split were evident. Regardless of the various ideologies represented or delegate political affiliation, the final vote 55 for the proposed Constitution to 40 against was along an east-west divide. Only one delegate voted yes from west of the Blue Ridge Mountains.

Outcomes

Some malapportionment in the General Assembly was eased relative to the majority of voters and white population in the Valley in the House of Delegates, but nothing for the transmontane west. Some suffrage restrictions were modified to include long term leaseholders and male heads of household. The Constitution of 1830 was a "triumph of traditionalism."

Historical accounts of the convention often relay interpretations of Hugh B. Grigsby that emphasize it as the "last gathering of giants." This approach typically omits names of the western reformers like Philip Doddridge who called for the convention in the first place. The "triumph of traditionalism" largely maintained traditional malapportionment preserving slaveowners’ disproportionate political power. This contributed to western Virginia counties’ later secession and formation of West Virginia led by Doddridge protégé Waitman T. Willey.

Notable attendees 
Alexander Campbell
Philip Doddridge
James Madison
John Marshall
James Monroe
John Randolph of Roanoke

The delegates to the Virginia Convention of 1829–1830 – elected in May and June, 1829 at the County Courts.
(Ninety-six members, four from each Senatorial District)

See also
Virginia Conventions

References

Bibliography

External links
Proceedings and Debates of the Virginia State Convention of 1829–30. Samuel Shepherd & Co. for Ritchie & Cook 1830 Richmond online from the archives of the University of Virginia at archive.org

Political history of Virginia
1829 in Virginia
1830 in Virginia
American constitutional conventions
1829 conferences
1830 conferences
1829 in American politics
1829 in the United States
1830 in American politics
1830 in the United States